The Taishō Tripiṭaka (Japanese: Taishō Shinshū Daizōkyō;  “Taishō Revised Tripiṭaka”) is a definitive edition of the Chinese Buddhist canon and its Japanese commentaries used by scholars in the 20th century. It was edited by Takakusu Junjiro and others.

The name is abbreviated as “” in Chinese and Japanese.

Contents
Volumes 1–85 are the literature, in which volumes 56–84 are Japanese Buddhist literature, written in Classical Chinese. Volumes 86–97 are Buddhism related drawings, includes drawings of many Buddhas and bodhisattvas. Volumes 98–100 are texts of different indexes of Buddhist texts known in Japan ca. 1930. The 85 volumes of literature contains 5,320 individual texts, classified as follows.

Digitalization
The SAT Daizōkyō Text Database edition contains volumes 1–85. The Chinese Buddhist Electronic Text Association (CBETA) edition contains volumes 1–55 and 85. The Fomei edition (佛梅電子大藏經) contains texts in Classical Chinese other than Nichiren Buddhism.

Volumes 56–84, although they were written in Classical Chinese, are actually written by Japanese Buddhist scholars.

Notes

Bibliography
 Matsumoto, T. (1934), Taishō Shinshū Daizōkyō oder kurz „Taishō Issaikyō“, Zeitschrift der Deutschen Morgenländischen Gesellschaft 88 (n.F. 13), No. 2, 194-199

External links

 The SAT Daizōkyō Text Database at the University of Tokyo
 Chinese Buddhist Electronic Text Association (CBETA)
NTI Buddhist Text Reader
中國傳統佛教資料下載
佛教電子書
大正大藏經　【大正藏網頁版】
Bukkyo Dendo Kyokai Japan provides some English translations (pdf) from the BDK English Tripitaka series.
Bibliography of Translations from the Chinese Buddhist Canon into Western Languages 
Chinese-English Tripitaka with All Titles and Known Translations in English

Tripiṭaka
Chinese Buddhist texts
Books about Buddhism in Japan